Elizabeth Edwards (born 1988) is an American politician and former Democratic member of the New Hampshire House of Representatives, representing the Hillsborough 11th District from 2014 to 2018.

Political activity
Although a member of the Democratic Party, Edwards was initially endorsed by the libertarian New Hampshire Liberty Alliance, and was "closely associated" with the Free State Project (FSP). She has since distanced herself from the FSP, and was not endorsed by the NHLA when she ran for re-election in 2016.

In January 2016, Edwards introduced a bill to decriminalize prostitution in New Hampshire between consenting adults. The bill was opposed by Republican house majority leader Richard Hinch, who commented that "society is just not ready for that". Edwards is also an advocate of drug policy reform. With assistance from other FSP members, Edwards helped pass a bill to give drug users immunity from prosecution when they report a drug-related medical emergency.

References

External links
 Elizabeth Edwards for State Representative

Democratic Party members of the New Hampshire House of Representatives
Living people
Women state legislators in New Hampshire
LGBT state legislators in New Hampshire
Politicians from Manchester, New Hampshire
Lesbian politicians
1988 births
21st-century American politicians
21st-century American women politicians
American libertarians